Kølkær Parish is a parish in the Diocese of Viborg in Herning Municipality, Denmark. The parish contains the town of Kølkær.

References 

Herning Municipality
Parishes of Denmark